Retinia resinella, the pine resin-gall moth, is a moth of the family Tortricidae.

Description
The wingspan of Retinia resinella can reach 16–22 mm. Adults are on wing from May to June.

The larva lives in the shoots of Pinus sylvestris where it causes a resin gall to develop. Development takes two years.

Parasites
The larvae are attached by the tachinid fly Actia nudibasis.

Distribution
This species can be found from Europe to eastern Russia, China (Heilongjiang, Inner Mongolia) and Japan.

References

External links
Lepidoptera of Belgium 
UKmoths
Eurasian Tortricidae 

Eucosmini
Moths described in 1758
Taxa named by Carl Linnaeus
Moths of Japan
Moths of Europe